A Jackson was an English professional footballer who played as a full back.

Jackson played 2 league matches for Lincoln City in their first season in the Football League, he also played in an FA Cup match against Newark

References

Year of birth unknown
English footballers
Association football defenders
Lincoln City F.C. players
English Football League players
Year of death missing